Nkongho, or Upper Mbo, is a poorly known Bantu language of Cameroon. Apart from being Bantu, it is not demonstrably related to the Mbo language.

References

Sawabantu languages
Languages of Cameroon